The Guest Lecture is a novel by Martin Riker which was published on 24 January 2023 by Grove Atlantic.

Critical reception 
Dwight Garner of The New York Times wrote "Martin Riker’s novel The Guest Lecture details a tortured night inside the head of a young economist." and Maggie Lange of The Washington Post wrote "The Guest Lecture analyzes how people live with their ideas, particularly when the world tells them those ideas are misguided".

The novel has been also reviewed by Ann Levin of Associated Press.

References 

Grove Atlantic books
2023 American novels